San Cristobal de la Habana is the name of a Cuban cigar brand produced in Cuba for Habanos SA, the Cuban state-owned tobacco company.

History 

San Cristobal de la Habana was officially launched in Havana on November 20, 1999.  It was named after the original name of Havana which dates back to the 16th century.

Before the Revolution, a brand by the name of San Cristobal de la Habana existed, and it was produced until the Revolution.  However, this new brand is completely unrelated and not a resurrection of the old brand.

The brand initially launched with 4 cigars (El Morro, El Principe, La Fuerza, and La Punta).  In 2004, to celebrate the brand's fifth anniversary, 3 additional cigars were produced for the V Anniversary Humidor and eventually released for public sale.  These new cigars, the Officios, Mercaderes and Muralla, also feature an additional "La Casa del Habano" band as these cigars were only available at La Casa del Habano retailers.

Vitolas in the San Cristobal de la Habana Line

The following list of vitolas de salida (commercial vitolas) within the San Cristobal de la Habana marque lists their size and ring gauge in Imperial (and Metric), their vitolas de galera (factory vitolas), and their common name in American cigar slang.

Hand-Made Vitolas
 El Morro - 7" × 49 (184 × 19.45 mm), Paco, a double corona
 El Principe - 4" × 42 (111 × 16.67 mm), Minuto, a petit corona
 La Fuerza - 5" × 50 (140 × 19.84 mm), Gordito, a robusto extra
 La Punta - 5" × 52 (140 × 20.64 mm), Campana, a pyramid
 Mercaderes - 6" × 48 (165 × 19.05 mm), Hermoso No. 1, a grand corona
 Muralla - 7" × 54 (181 × 21.43 mm), Rodolfos, a double pyramid
 Officios - 5" × 43 (133 × 17.07 mm), Dalias Cortas, a corona

See also 
 Cigar brands

References
 Nee, Min Ron - An Illustrated Encyclopaedia of Post-Revolution Havana Cigars (2003, Reprinted: 2005),

External links
 Official website of Habanos S.A.

Habanos S.A. brands